Openbay is an online marketplace for automotive repair and maintenance services and a provider of SaaS for the automotive service industry. in the United States. The company is headquartered in Cambridge, Massachusetts, and it was founded by CEO, Rob Infantino, in 2012.

Product 
Vehicle owners enter their need for service or describe the repair or maintenance problem. The Openbay platform automatically generates multiple competitive price estimates from local automotive service professionals. Vehicle owners then compare each automotive service professional based on location, amenities, pricing, and customer ratings.  Consumers book an appointment with the service provider of their choice. Payment for services is processed onsite by the professional that serviced the vehicle. More than 70% of Openbay users do not select the lowest-priced service provider. Openbay charges a flat booking fee to the repair shop upon completion of the service.

References 

Online marketplaces of the United States
Automotive websites